Vega de Santa María is a municipality located in the province of Ávila, Castile and León, Spain. According to the 2006 census (INE), the municipality has a population of 118.

The municipality is located at a distance about 90 km northwest of Madrid, 20 km north of Avila.

The most popular holidays are in honour of Nuestra Señora de la Asunción (Our lady of the Ascension - August 15) and Purísima Concepción (Immaculate conception - December 8).

References

Municipalities in the Province of Ávila